Alutça is a village in the Harmancık district of Bursa Province in Turkey.

References

Villages in Harmancık District